The 2022–23 Illinois Fighting Illini men's basketball team represented the University of Illinois in the 2022–23 NCAA Division I men's basketball season. Led by sixth-year head coach Brad Underwood, the Illini played their home games at the State Farm Center in Champaign, Illinois as members of the Big Ten Conference. They finished the season 20–11, 11–9 in Big Ten play to finish in a four-way tie in fifth place for regular-season play. As the No. 7 seed in the Big Ten tournament, they were defeated by No. 10 seed Penn State in the Second Round. They received an at-large bid to the NCAA tournament as the No. 9 seed in the West Region, where they were defeated by No. 8 seed Arkansas in the First Round.

Previous season
The Illini finished the 2021–22 season 23–10, 15–5 in Big Ten play to finish in a tie for the regular season championship. As the No. 1 seed in the Big Ten tournament, they were defeated by No. 9 seed Indiana in the quarterfinals. They received an at-large bid to the NCAA tournament as the No. 4 seed in the South Region, where they defeated Chattanooga in the First Round before losing to Houston in the Second Round.

Offseason

Departures

Incoming transfers

2022 recruiting class

Roster

Schedule and results

|-
!colspan=12 style=""| Exhibition

|-
!colspan=12 style=""| Regular Season

|-
!colspan=12 style=""| Big Ten tournament

|-
!colspan=12 style=""| NCAA Tournament

Rankings

*AP does not release post-NCAA Tournament rankings.

References

2022–23 Big Ten Conference men's basketball season
2022-23
Illinois Fighting Illini men's basketball
Illinois Fighting Illini men's basketball
Illinois